Roundwood, historically known as Tóchar (meaning 'the causeway'), is a village in County Wicklow, Ireland. It was listed as having a population of 948 in the 2016 census.

Geography 
Roundwood is located where the R755 road joins the R764 and R765. The R755 is part of the main route from Dublin to Glendalough in the Wicklow Mountains. At 238 metres above sea level, Roundwood is one of the highest villages in Ireland.

Vartry Reservoir Lakes (reservoirs built in the 1860s) are close by.

History 

Roundwood has a close association with two former Presidents of Ireland, Seán T. O'Kelly who lived locally, and Erskine Hamilton Childers, who, with other family members, is buried in Derrylossary 
Anglican churchyard near the village.

Sport

The local Gaelic football and ladies' Gaelic football club is An Tóchar GAA.

Twin towns — sister cities 

Roundwood is twinned with the village of Spézet, in Brittany,  northwestern France. The schools in both areas regularly communicate and engage with another. For many years, exchange programmes have been in place for the students.

See also 
 List of towns and villages in Ireland
 List of twin towns and sister cities in Ireland

References

External links 
 
 
 

Towns and villages in County Wicklow